Jesse Sarajärvi (born 20 May 1995) is a Finnish footballer, who most recently played for Seinäjoen Jalkapallokerho.

Sarajärvi was a part of the Veikkausliiga title winning SJK in 2015, but only played in one game. It was the first title in club history. He made his SJK debut in 2012.

In January 2020 it was told that Sarajärvi would take a break from football because of a tumour in his pituitary gland.

Sarajärvi's father is entrepreneur and SJK chairman Raimo Sarajärvi.

References

1995 births
Living people
Finnish footballers
Veikkausliiga players
SJK Akatemia players
FC YPA players
Association football midfielders
People from Seinäjoki
Sportspeople from South Ostrobothnia